Yank, the Army Weekly was a weekly magazine published by the United States military during World War II.

History
The idea for the magazine came from Egbert White, who had worked on the newspaper Stars and Stripes during World War I. He proposed the idea to the Army in early 1942, and accepted a commission as lieutenant colonel. White was the overall commander, Major Franklin S. Forsberg was the business manager and Major Hartzell Spence was the first editor. White was removed from the Yank staff because of disagreements about articles which had appeared. Soon afterward, Spence was also assigned to other duties and Joe McCarthy became the editor. 
 
The first issue was published with the cover date of June 17, 1942.  The magazine was written by enlisted rank (EM) soldiers with a few officers as managers, and initially was made available only to the US Army overseas. By the fifth issue of July 15, 1942, it was made available to serving members within the US, however it was never made available on the newsstands for public purchase. YANK's circulation exceeded 2.5 million in 41 countries with 21 editions.

The last issue was published on December 28, 1945. Joe McCarthy remained the editor of Yank until the official closure of the office on New Year's Eve 1945.

Trimmingham letter 

The magazine's April 28, 1944 edition included a letter from a black corporal, Rupert Trimmingham, complaining that white German prisoners of war were being treated with more respect than black American soldiers. The reaction to the letter was strong and immediate. In a follow-up letter published 28 July 1944, Trimmingham said that he had received 287 letters, 183 from whites, supporting his position. The editors reported that Yank had received "a great number of comments from GIs, almost all of whom were outraged by the treatment given to the corporal." The same year, the letter inspired a short story by Robert E. McLaughlin, "A Short Wait between Trains," and in 1945, a one-act play by Ruth Moore.

Artists and photographers
Sketch artists such as Robert Greenhalgh, Victor Kalin and Howard Brodie worked on the magazine, which also featured the "G.I. Joe" cartoons by Dave Breger and the Sad Sack cartoons by Sgt. George Baker. The cartoons of Bil Keane of Family Circus were featured in "Yank," and artist and author Jack Coggins spent over two years with the publication, first in New York, then in London, producing illustrations and articles in more than 24 issues. John Bushemi was a photographer, who photographed the Pacific War and provided covers for Yank.

Revival 

In 2014, the 1st Stryker Brigade Combat Team, 1st Armored Division, Fort Bliss, Texas, revived Yank as the official publication for the brigade.  Each cover of the 1/1 Yank features Soldiers from the brigade recreating a cover photo from the original Yank magazine.

References

External links

 
 
 

Weekly magazines published in the United States
Defunct magazines published in the United States
Magazines established in 1942
Magazines disestablished in 1945
Military magazines published in the United States
World War II and the media
United States Army publications